In five-dimensional Euclidean geometry, the omnitruncated 5-simplex honeycomb or omnitruncated hexateric honeycomb is a space-filling tessellation (or honeycomb). It is composed entirely of omnitruncated 5-simplex facets.

The facets of all  omnitruncated simplectic honeycombs are called permutahedra and can be positioned in n+1 space with integral coordinates, permutations of the whole numbers (0,1,..,n).

A5* lattice 
The A lattice (also called A) is the union of six A5 lattices, and is the dual vertex arrangement to the omnitruncated 5-simplex honeycomb, and therefore the Voronoi cell of this lattice is an omnitruncated 5-simplex.

 ∪
 ∪
 ∪
 ∪
 ∪
 = dual of

Related polytopes and honeycombs

Projection by folding 

The omnitruncated 5-simplex honeycomb can be projected into the 3-dimensional omnitruncated cubic honeycomb by a geometric folding operation that maps two pairs of mirrors into each other, sharing the same 3-space vertex arrangement:

See also 
Regular and uniform honeycombs in 5-space:
5-cube honeycomb
5-demicube honeycomb
5-simplex honeycomb

Notes

References 
 Norman Johnson Uniform Polytopes, Manuscript (1991)
 Kaleidoscopes: Selected Writings of H. S. M. Coxeter, edited by F. Arthur Sherk, Peter McMullen, Anthony C. Thompson, Asia Ivic Weiss, Wiley-Interscience Publication, 1995,  
 (Paper 22) H.S.M. Coxeter, Regular and Semi Regular Polytopes I, [Math. Zeit. 46 (1940) 380-407, MR 2,10] (1.9 Uniform space-fillings)
 (Paper 24) H.S.M. Coxeter, Regular and Semi-Regular Polytopes III, [Math. Zeit. 200 (1988) 3-45]

Honeycombs (geometry)
6-polytopes